Craigneach Castle was a tower house, about  east of Carron, Strathspey, Moray, Scotland, and  west of Charlestown of Aberlour , north of the River Spey.

History
The property may be the “Place of Elchies” plundered in 1645 by the Covenanters, although little about it is certain.

Structure
Craigneath Castle was an L-plan castle, on a spur, in a commanding position.  The building was of about  internal width.  There was a dry-stone enclosure wall.

There are now no remains.

See also
Castles in Great Britain and Ireland
List of castles in Scotland

References

Castles in Moray